The Agricultural Labourers' Union (Histadrut HaPoalim HaHakla'im) was a trade union in Israel, founded in 1918.

Elections
Internal elections were held for the first time in 1968. A total of 45,000 union members were eligible to vote, of which 68% took part in the polling.

References

Agriculture and forestry trade unions
Histadrut
Trade unions established in 1918